Anurolimnas is a genus of birds that the South American Classification Committee of the American Ornithological Society and the Clements taxonomy apply to the chestnut-headed crake (A. castaneiceps), the russet-crowned crake (A. viridis), and the black-banded crake (A. fasciatus). The International Ornithological Committee assigns the first two species to genus Rufirallus and the black-banded to genus Laterallus. BirdLife International's Handbook of the Birds of the World also places the first two in Rufirallus but assigns the black-banded to genus Porzana.

References

Rallidae